T. V. S. N. Prasad (born 14 October 1964) is an Indian Administrative Service officer (1988 Batch), currently serving as Home Secretary to the Government of Haryana. He is an Edward S. Mason Fellow in Public Policy and Management and a John Kenneth Galbraith Scholar in Infrastructure Economics at the Harvard Kennedy School of Government. He was Lead Infrastructure Coordinator and Senior Energy Specialist in the Africa Division of the World Bank, leading power, oil and gas sector national economic policies, investments, and infrastructure expansion. He worked in the Government of India as Mission Director of National Mission of Clean Ganga, and later as Joint/Additional Secretary in the Ministry of Home Affairs. He was also the Finance and Treasury Secretary to Government of Haryana from 2018 till 2022.

Early life and education
T.V.S.N. Prasad was born in a Telugu family from East Godavari District, Andhra Pradesh. His father, Hon'ble Mr. Justice T.H.B. Chalapathi, served as a Hon'ble Judge in the Andhra Pradesh High Court and the Punjab and Haryana High Court. Prasad completed his schooling from Hyderabad Public School, Begumpet. He obtained his graduation in Bacherlors in Electrical Engineering from Jawaharlal Nehru Technological University, Hyderabad. He later went on to study at Harvard University, where he earned a Masters in Public Administration at the Harvard Kennedy School of Government on an Edward S. Mason Fellowship.

Career
Prasad joined the Indian Administrative Service in 1988, serving in the Haryana Cadre. As an IAS officer, he has held numerous positions, such as Deputy Commissioner, Rohtak and Kurukshetra, founding Chairman and Managing Director, Andhra Pradesh Central Power Distribution Company, Chief Administrator, Haryana State Agricultural Marketing Board, and Principal Secretary, Department of Food, Civil Supplies, and Consumer Affairs, Government of Haryana. During his stint in the Central Government between 2014 and 2018, Prasad served as Mission Director in the National Mission for Clean Ganga and Joint Secretary (later as Additional Secretary) in the Ministry of Home Affairs.

During his career, he has been awarded Best District Collector for Efforts to make the District Achieve the Country Lowest Population Growth Rate (1998). He has also been credited for turning around a loss making electric utility into profit making entity in the States of Haryana and Andhra Pradesh. While at the Ministry of Home Affairs, he chaired a Committee to explore alternative solutions to the use of Pellet Guns by Indian Paramilitary Forces and was instrumental in reviving the Crime and Criminal Tracking Network & Systems project.

During his stint at the World Bank, he has served as Senior Energy Specialist and Lead Infrastructure Coordinator in the Africa Division of the World Bank, leading power, oil and gas sector national economic policies, investments, and infrastructure expansion. He has many publications in his name, notably as Lead Author of the book Monitoring Performance of Electric Utilities - Indicators and Benchmarking, which was published by the World Bank in 2009. His efforts in the power and natural oil gas sector have been lauded by many experts in the African region, especially with respect to his work in distribution and generation.

References

wrmin.nic.in/forms/list.aspx?lid=656&Id=4

1964 births
Living people
Indian Administrative Service officers
World Bank people
Harvard Kennedy School alumni
Mason Fellows